Felipe Muñoz Kapamas (born February 3, 1951) is a Mexican former breaststroke swimmer. He competed at the 1968 and 1972 Summer Olympics and won a gold medal in the 200 m event in 1968. Since 2008, he is the President of the Mexican Olympic Committee. He served as Deputy of the LV and LXII Legislature of the Mexican Congress.

Muñoz is of Greek descent on his mother's side.

His nickname is "el tibio", which means "lukewarm" in Spanish, a nickname which has multiple possible explanations. According to some sources, it was coined because he had the habit of refusing to swim in an unheated pool. However, other sources, including the International Swimming Hall of Fame, have stated that it was because his mother was from the town of Río Frío (meaning Cold River) and his father was from the town of Aguascalientes (meaning Hot Springs).

See also
 List of members of the International Swimming Hall of Fame

References

1951 births
Living people
Mexican male swimmers
Mexican male breaststroke swimmers
Swimmers at the 1968 Summer Olympics
Swimmers at the 1971 Pan American Games
Swimmers at the 1972 Summer Olympics
Olympic swimmers of Mexico
Olympic gold medalists for Mexico
Swimmers from Mexico City
Mexican people of Greek descent
Texas Longhorns men's swimmers
Institutional Revolutionary Party politicians
Members of the Chamber of Deputies (Mexico)
Medalists at the 1968 Summer Olympics
Pan American Games silver medalists for Mexico
Pan American Games bronze medalists for Mexico
Olympic gold medalists in swimming
20th-century Mexican politicians
21st-century Mexican politicians
Pan American Games medalists in swimming
Universiade medalists in swimming
Competitors at the 1970 Central American and Caribbean Games
Competitors at the 1974 Central American and Caribbean Games
Central American and Caribbean Games gold medalists for Mexico
Mexican sportsperson-politicians
Universiade bronze medalists for Mexico
Central American and Caribbean Games medalists in swimming
Medalists at the 1973 Summer Universiade
Medalists at the 1971 Pan American Games
Deputies of the LXII Legislature of Mexico